A player piano (also known as a pianola) is a self-playing piano containing a pneumatic or electro-mechanical mechanism, that operates the piano action via programmed music recorded on perforated paper or metallic rolls, with more modern implementations using MIDI. The rise of the player piano grew with the rise of the mass-produced piano for the home, in the late 19th and early 20th century. Sales peaked in 1924, then declined, as the improvement in phonograph recordings due to electrical recording methods developed in the mid-1920s. The advent of electrical amplification in home music reproduction via radio in the same period helped cause their eventual decline in popularity, and the stock market crash of 1929 virtually wiped out production.

History
In 1896, Edwin S. Votey invented the first practical pneumatic piano player, called the Pianola.

This mechanism came into widespread use in the 20th century, and was all-pneumatic, with foot-operated bellows providing a source of vacuum needed to operate a pneumatic motor, driving the take-up spool, while each small inrush of air through a hole in the paper roll was amplified in two pneumatic stages, to sufficient strength to strike a note.

1900–1910 

Votey advertised the Pianola widely, making unprecedented use of full-page color advertisements. It was sold initially for $250. Other, cheaper makes were launched. A standard 65-note format evolved, with  rolls and holes spaced 6 to the inch, although several player manufacturers used their own form of roll incompatible with other makes.

By 1903, the Aeolian Company had more than 9,000 roll titles in their catalog, adding 200 titles per month. Many companies' catalogs ran to thousands of rolls, mainly consisting of light, religious or classical music. Ragtime music did feature, but not commonly.

Melville Clark, introduced two key features to the player piano, the full-scale roll which could play every note on the piano keyboard, and the internal player as standard.

By the end of the decade, the piano player device and the 65-note format became obsolete. This caused issues for many small manufacturers, who had spent their capital on setting up 65-note player operations, and the result was rapid consolidation in the industry.

A new full-scale roll format, playing all 88 notes, was agreed at an industry conference in Buffalo, New York in 1908, the so-called Buffalo Convention.  This kept the 11-inch roll, but now had smaller holes spaced at 9 to the inch. This meant that any player could now play any make of roll. This consensus was key to avoiding a costly format war, which plagued almost every other form of entertainment media that followed roll music.

While the player piano matured in America, an inventor in Germany, Edwin Welte, was working on a player which would reproduce all the aspects of the performance automatically, so that his machine would play back a recorded performance exactly as if the original pianist were sitting at the piano keyboard. Known as a Reproducing Piano, this device, the Welte-Mignon, was launched in 1904. It created new marketing opportunities, as manufacturers could now get the foremost pianists and composers of the day to record their performances on a piano roll, allowing owners of player pianos to experience such a performance in their own homes on their own instruments, exactly as the original pianist had played it.

Aeolian introduced Metrostyle in 1901 and the Themodist in 1904, the latter being an invention "bringing out the melody clearly above the accompaniment." With sales growing rapidly, and the instruments themselves relatively mature, this decade saw a wider variety of rolls become available. Two major advances were the introduction of the hand-played roll, both classical and popular, and the word roll.
 Hand-played rolls introduced musical phrasing into the rolls, so that player pianists did not have to introduce it through the use of tempo controls something that few owners ever felt much inclination to do.
 Word rolls, featured printed lyrics in the margins, making it simple to use players to accompany singing in the home, a very popular activity in the years before radio and disc recordings became widely available.

The other major advance was the arrival in America of two major commercial rivals for the Welte-Mignon Reproducing Piano: the Ampico (from 1911 but fully 're-enacting' by 1916) and the Duo-Art (1914). Artrio-Angelus also introduced a reproducing player from 1916. When World War I came in 1914, German patents were seized in the US. In England, Aeolian had a huge factory and sales network, so easily outsold the Ampico. Other makers of Reproducing systems were successful in Europe: Hupfeld Meisterspiel DEA (1907) and Philipps Duca (c 1909). Hupfeld perfected an 88 note reproducing system, the Triphonola, in 1919 It is estimated that around 5% of players sold were Reproducing Pianos.

In America by the end of the decade, the new 'jazz age' and the rise of the fox-trot confirmed the player piano as the instrument of popular music, with classical music increasingly relegated to the reproducing piano. Most American roll companies stopped offering large classical catalogs before 1920, and abandoned 'instrumental' rolls (those without words) within a few years.

In England, the Aeolian Company continued to find success selling classical material, as well as customers willing to contribute to performances by following directions printed on the rolls and operate the hand and foot controls. Sydney Grew, in his manual The Art of the Piano Player, published in London in 1922, said that "it takes about three years to make a good player-pianist of a man of woman of average musical intelligence. It takes about seven years to make a good pianist, or organist, or singer". Word rolls never became the norm in England, always being charged at a 20% premium over non-word rolls. As a result, post-World War I American and British roll collections look very different.

1950–present 

During the early 1950s, a number of collectors began to collect player pianos and all the other instruments of the 1920s and earlier. Among them was Frank Holland, who formed his collection while working in Canada. On returning to England, he located a number of like-minded enthusiasts and started to hold meetings at his house in west London. In 1959 this was formalized as 'The Player Piano Group'. By the early 1960s, Frank Holland had formed the British Piano Museum (now the Musical Museum) in Brentford.

In America, another collector was Harvey Roehl, who was so enthused by the players that in 1961 he published a book called Player Piano Treasury. This sold by the tens of thousands, and was followed by books on how to rebuild and restore these instruments. Roehl's Vestal Press was a major driving force in raising awareness of the player piano within the general population.

Other societies worldwide were formed to preserve and study all aspects of mechanical music, such as the Musical Box Society International (MBSI) and the Automatic Musical Instruments Collector's Association (AMICA) in the USA.

In 1961, Max Kortlander died of a heart attack, and QRS was run by his wife until she sold the company to Ramsi Tick in 1966, who focussed on limiting losses rather than widening profits. QRS's presence ensured that owners of newly awakened players could purchase rolls of the latest titles, so ensuring that the instrument remained current, not just a historical curiosity.

The revival of interest in player pianos in the 1960s, lead to the production of player pianos to start again. Aeolian revived the Pianola, albeit this time in a small spinet piano suited to post-war housing. Other manufacturers followed, and production has continued intermittently ever since. QRS today offers a traditional player piano in its Story and Clark piano.

In recent years, there has been greater focus on full rebuilding as original instruments. Early enthusiasts could often get by with limited patching, but the repair requirements have slowly risen, although to this day it is possible to find original 1920s instruments that still work.

Types 

While there are many minor differences between manufacturers, a player piano is a piano that contains a manually controlled pneumatically operating piano player mechanism. It is intended that the operator manually manipulates the control levers in order to produce a musical performance. Various aids to the human operator were developed:

 Split stack control These instruments (the vast majority of all player pianos) have the pneumatic player mechanism divided into two approximately equal halves. The operator can lower the volume of either half of the keyboard independently of the other in order to create musical effects.
 Theme control These instruments have peripheral pneumatic hardware systems fitted which, when used in conjunction with special music rolls, are able to highlight those notes in the score which are intended to be accented away from those whose volume it is desired to subdue. Basic theme pianos subdue all notes and release full power to only those notes which are aligned with special music roll "theme" perforations. Subtler systems (such as Hupfeld's "Solodant" and Aeolian's "Themodist") have a graduated theme control where the background subdued level and the foreground melody level are both controllable. The nature of the mechanism is such that where a chord occurs notes to be emphasised have to be advanced slightly away from their neighbours in order for the mechanism to identify them.
 Isolated theme The hardware of these pianos is able to pick out the melody notes away from their background  accompaniment within the entire range of the keyboard without the necessity for breaking up chords i.e. a software workaround. Manufacturers of these systems were the UK "Dalian" and "Kastonome" and the US "Solo Carola".
 Expression player  The hardware of these pianos is able to generate a broad general musical dynamic from roll coding. The pneumatic stack operates at fixed pre-set tension levels depending on the coding giving a general effect of musical dynamics. Examples of this system are "Recordo" and "Empeco" 
 Reproducing pianos These are fully automated versions of the player piano requiring no human manual control in order to produce the illusion of a live musical performance. This is achieved by the utilization of music rolls where tempo mapping is fully incorporated into the music rolls i.e. the note lengths of a live performance have been captured. The volume dynamics are created by peripheral pneumatic expression accessories under control of system-specific music roll coding. This obviates the need for human manipulation of the manual dynamic control levers. Typically an electric motor provides power to remove the human operator from the necessity to provide motive power by treadling. Most reproducing pianos are capable of manual over-ride operation, and many are constructed for dual functionality both as regular player pianos and also as reproducing pianos. Numerous companies made these utilizing different technology. The first successful instrument was called the "Mignon" launched by Welte in 1904.

Music rolls 

Music rolls for pneumatic player pianos, often known as piano rolls, consist of a continuous sheet of paper rolled on to a spool. The spool fits into the player piano spool box whereupon the free end of the music sheet is hooked onto the take-up spool which will unwind the roll at an even pace across the reading mechanism (the "tracker bar") The music score to be played is programmed onto the paper by means of perforations. Different player systems have different perforation sizes, channel layouts and spool fittings though the majority conform to one or two predominant formats latterly adopted as the industry standard.

Music is programmed via a number of methods.
 the music is marked out on master stencil on a purely metronomic basis direct from the printed sheet music with the player-pianists being left to create their own music performance
 the music stencil is created metronomically via a piano-keyboard operated punch machine
 a live performance is played onto a special piano connected to an electronically operated marking mechanism, and a physical stencil is produced from this live output, either as-is or after some general regularisation of tempo where necessary
 modern computer software and MIDI software can be used to create piano roll stencils for operating modern-day perforating machines and create new titles.

The player piano sold globally in its heyday, and music rolls were manufactured extensively in the US, as well as most European countries, South America, Australia and New Zealand. A large number of titles from all manufacturers survive to this day, and rolls still turn up regularly in large quantities.

It was reported that the last remaining mass producer of piano rolls in the world, QRS Music, temporarily halted production of the rolls on December 31, 2008.
However, QRS Music still list themselves as the only roll manufacturer remaining, and claim to have 45,000 titles available with "new titles being added on a regular basis".

The Musical Museum in Brentford, London, England houses a nationally significant collection of piano rolls, with over 20,000 rolls, as well as an extensive collection of instruments which may be seen and heard.

Modern implementations 

Later developments of the reproducing piano include the use of magnetic tape and floppy disks, rather than piano rolls, to record and play back the music; and, in the case of one instrument made by Bösendorfer, computer assisted playback.

In 1982, Yamaha Corporation introduced the "Piano Player", which was the first mass-produced, commercially available reproducing piano that was capable of digitally capturing and reproducing a piano performance using floppy disk as a storage medium. The Piano Player was replaced in 1987 by the Yamaha Disklavier and since 1998, the Disklavier PRO models are capable of capturing and reproducing "high-resolution" piano performances of up to 1024 velocity levels and 256 increments of positional pedalling using Yamaha's proprietary XP (Extended Precision) MIDI specification.

Almost all modern player pianos use MIDI to interface with computer equipment. Most modern player pianos come with an electronic device that can record and playback MIDI files on floppy disks and/or CD-ROMs, and a MIDI interface that enables computers to drive the piano directly for more advanced operations. The MIDI files can trigger electromechanical solenoids, which use electric current to drive small mechanical plungers mounted to the key action inside the piano.  Live performance or computer generated music can be recorded in MIDI file format for accurate reproduction later on such instruments.  MIDI files containing converted antique piano-rolls can be purchased on the Internet.

, several player piano conversion kits are available (PianoDisc, PNOmation, etc.), allowing the owners of normal pianos to convert them into computer controlled instruments. The conversion process usually involves cutting open the bottom of the piano to install mechanical parts under the keyboard, although one organization—Logos Foundation—has manufactured a portable, external kit. A new player piano conversion kit was introduced in 2007-08 by Wayne Stahnke, the inventor of the Bösendorfer SE reproducing system, called the "LX".

Steinway now manufactures a player piano based on Wayne Stahnke's Live Performance LX system. Live Performance Model LX, was sold to Steinway in 2014 and re-branded as Spirio. In contrast to other piano brands, a recording option was not originally available in Steinway Spirio pianos. However, in 2019 Steinway introduced the Spirio | r, which is capable of both reproducing and recording piano music for later playback.

Edelweiss is a British music upcomer on the player piano market offering totally bespoke pianos, available in luxury department store Harrods since 2017 and according to the Financial Times YouTube channel 'How to Spend it', Edelweiss is "regarded as the most upmarket of today's breed of the self-playing piano".

Comparison to electric pianos 
A player piano is neither an electric piano, electronic piano, nor a digital piano. The distinction between these instruments lies in the way sounds are produced. A player piano is an acoustic piano where the sound is produced by hammer strikes on the piano strings. Electrical or electronic components are limited to moving the keys or hammers mimicking the actions of a person; no sound is produced from electrically amplified audio.

See also 
 Mechanical organ
 Punched tape
 Virtual piano
 Circus Galop, a piano piece specifically designed for the player piano
 Conlon Nancarrow, a significant composer for the player piano

References

Further reading 
 Grew, Sydney. The Art of the Player Piano: A text book for student and teacher (1922)
 Reblitz, Arthur A. Player Piano Servicing and Rebuilding.  Lanham, Maryland: Vestal Press, 1985.
 Reblitz, Arthur A. The Golden Age of Automatic Musical Instruments.  Woodsville, New Hampshire: Mechanical Music Press, 2001.
 White, William Braid. Regulation and Repair of Piano and Player Mechanism together with Tuning as Science and Art.  New York: Edward Lyman Bill, 1909.

External links 

 The Pianola Forum The Pianola Forum
 The Pianola Institute London, England

Mechanical musical instruments
Piano
Pneumatics
Articles containing video clips